The Federal Correctional Institution, Edgefield (FCI Edgefield) is a medium-security United States federal prison for male inmates in South Carolina. It is operated by the Federal Bureau of Prisons, a division of the United States Department of Justice. The facility also has an adjacent satellite prison camp for minimum-security male offenders which houses between 500 and 549 inmates.

The satellite prison camp also has the Residential Drug and Alcohol Program which is part of the prison reform and rehabilitation program for those that are addicted to drugs and alcohol.

FCI Edgefield is located near the South Carolina-Georgia border, approximately 25 miles north of Augusta, Georgia.

Notable incidents
In 2002, a correction officer assigned to FCI Edgefield, whom the Bureau of Prisons did not identify, pleaded guilty and was sentenced on Georgia state charges to three years' incarceration followed by seven years' supervised release for possession with the intent to distribute marijuana. A joint investigation by the Department of Justice Inspector General's Office and the Richmond County Sheriff's Office revealed that the officer took over $9,000 in bribes in exchange for receiving packages containing marijuana and passing them on to inmates.

On May 20, 2010, the US Attorney's Office in Columbia, South Carolina announced that two former correctional officers at FCI Edgefield, Gregory Conyers and Antonio Heath, had been indicted for accepting bribes from inmate Boyce Tisdale in exchange for smuggling contraband into the facility. Conyers and Heath subsequently pleaded guilty and were sentenced to prison. Tisdale was transferred to the Federal Correctional Complex, Butner in North Carolina and is scheduled for release in 2023.

Notable inmates (current and former)

See also

List of U.S. federal prisons
Federal Bureau of Prisons
Incarceration in the United States

References

External links 
Federal Correctional Institution, Edgefield  – Official website

 Searchinmate.us:  Federal Correctional Institution Edgefield

Edgefield
Edgefield
Buildings and structures in Edgefield County, South Carolina